Berenice Sinexve is a South African politician and a party member of the African National Congress (ANC). She was a Member of the Northern Cape Provincial Legislature and the MEC (Member of the Executive Council) for Sport, Arts and Culture from May 2019 to June 2020.

References

External links
Bernice Sinxeve – People's Assembly
Northern Cape Provincial Legislature profile. Archived on 12 June 2020.

Living people
African National Congress politicians
People from the Northern Cape
Members of the Northern Cape Provincial Legislature
Year of birth missing (living people)
21st-century South African politicians
21st-century South African women politicians